Parkland is an informal geographic region of the Canadian province of Manitoba, located between Lakes Manitoba and Winnipegosis on the east and the Manitoba–Saskatchewan border on the west.

The largest population centre is the city of Dauphin, and the second largest is the town of Swan River. Riding Mountain National Park, Duck Mountain Provincial Park, and Asessippi Provincial Park are also located in the region, as well as Manitoba's highest point, Baldy Mountain.

Together with the Westman Region to the south, Parkland composes the broader Prairie Mountain region, and is provided health services via Prairie Mountain Health. As of 2016, the Parkland region had a population of 43,787.

Major communities
Urban municipalities:

 Dauphin (city)
 Swan River (town)

Unorganized areas:

 Unorganized Division No. 17
 Unorganized North Division No. 20
 Unorganized South Division No. 20

Rural municipalities and communities

First Nations and reserves 

 Ebb and Flow (Ebb and Flow 52)
 Gambler (Gambler 63, partly)
 Tootinaowaziibeeng
 Valley River 63A
 Waywayseecappo

Recreation and points of interest

Parks and geography 

 Asessippi Provincial Park
 Asessippi Ski Area — Manitoba's largest ski resort
 Dauphin Lake
 Duck Mountain Provincial Forest
 Duck Mountain Provincial Park
 Baldy Mountain — Manitoba's highest peak
 Manipogo Provincial Park
 Riding Mountain Biosphere Reserve
 Riding Mountain National Park
 Shellmouth Reservoir
 Thunderhill Ski Area
 Valley River

Transport 

 Dauphin station
 Gilbert Plains station
 Grandview railway station
 Laurier railway station
 Lt. Col W.G. (Billy) Barker VC Airport
 Ochre River station
 Roblin railway station
 Ste. Rose du Lac Airport
 Provincial Trunk Highways 5, 10, 16, and 20

Recreation and other 

 Assiniboine Community College (satellite campus)
 Credit Union Place
 Dauphin’s Countryfest
 Inglis Grain Elevators National Historic Site
 Richardson Recreation and Wellness Centre
 Swan River Centennial Arena
 Waywayseecappo Wolverines Complex

Sports teams

 Dauphin Kings
 Swan Valley Stampeders
 Waywayseecappo Wolverines

References

External links
 Parkland Regional Profile
Parkland Tourism 
Community Profile: Census Division No. 16, Manitoba; Statistics Canada
Community Profile: Census Division No. 17, Manitoba; Statistics Canada
Community Profile: Census Division No. 20, Manitoba; Statistics Canada

 
Geographic regions of Manitoba